The ductus reuniens also the canalis reuniens of Hensen is part of the human inner ear. It connects the lower part of the saccule to the cochlear duct near its vestibular extremity.

See also
 Victor Hensen

References 

Ear